Kaktus Einarsson is a musician from Reykjavik, Iceland. Kaktus Einarsson is best known for his work in the Icelandic-band, Fufanu.

Further reading
Interviews
Ja Ja Ja Festival: Spotlight Interview – Fufanu (JaJaJa Festivalt, 2014)
Music: Interview with Icelandic Post-Punk Band Fufanu (Lola Who, 2015)
‘People are Always Trying to Put a Finger On Everything’: Fufanu Interviewed. (Figure 8 Music, 2015)
Takes Us Around Reykjavik And Talks New Album Sports'

Reviews
Pitchfork: Sports Album Review (Pitchfork, 2017)

References

Living people
Kaktus Einarsson
Year of birth missing (living people)